Pinhas Rubin (born 1949) is an Israeli lawyer and chairman of Gornitzky & Co., one of the largest law firms in Israel.

Biography

Pinhas Rubin is the firm chairman and a senior partner at Gornitzky & Co.

External links
Gornitzky & Co. Website
Pinhas Rubin's page on Gornitzky website
Adv. Pinhas Rubin's page on D&B
Adv. Pinhas Rubin- No. 15 in 'People of the Year'- Globes, 1/2008
A through interview with Adv. Pinhas Rubin- Globes, 9/2008

Living people
Israeli lawyers
1949 births